Norris Henry Cotton (May 11, 1900 – February 24, 1989) was an American politician from the state of New Hampshire. A member of the Republican Party, he served as a U.S. Representative and subsequently as a U.S. Senator.

Early life
Cotton was born on a farm in Warren, New Hampshire, and was educated at Phillips Exeter Academy in New Hampshire and Wesleyan University in Connecticut. He was the son of Henry Lang and Elizabeth (née Moses) Cotton. While in college, he served as a clerk to the New Hampshire State Senate. He also served as a member of the New Hampshire House of Representatives in 1923 as one of the youngest legislators in history. He became a lawyer after attending George Washington University Law School and practiced law in Lebanon, New Hampshire.

Career
Cotton was elected to the New Hampshire House of Representatives again in 1943, and served as majority leader that year and as Speaker from 1945 to 1947.

In 1946, Cotton was elected to the United States House of Representatives from New Hampshire's 2nd congressional district for the first time. He served until 1954, when he ran for a seat in the United States Senate from New Hampshire in a special election to fill the vacancy caused by the death of incumbent Senator Charles W. Tobey. He was elected to a full term in 1956, reelected twice and served in the Senate until 1975.

Cotton voted in favor of the Civil Rights Acts of 1957, 1960, and 1968, as well as the 24th Amendment to the U.S. Constitution, the Voting Rights Act of 1965, and the confirmation of Thurgood Marshall to the U.S. Supreme Court, but against the Civil Rights Act of 1964 and the Immigration and Nationality Act of 1965. Cotton was the only New England senator do so.  He was a prominent leader of his party in the Senate, chairing the Senate Republican Conference from 1973 to 1975. He did not run for reelection in 1974. Three days before his final term ran out, Cotton resigned to allow the governor to appoint Louis C. Wyman.

Cotton returned to the Senate in August 1975 after the election of his successor was contested. The closest Senate election in history, it went through two recounts at the state level, followed by protracted debate on the Senate floor, until both candidates agreed to a special election.  Cotton served as a temporary senator until the September 1975 special election, the result of which was not challenged; Cotton returned to Lebanon, New Hampshire. Cotton was the last senator to return to the senate via appointment for 43 years until Arizona's former Senator Jon Kyl was appointed by Governor Doug Ducey in 2018 following the death of Senator John McCain.

Death and legacy
Cotton died on February 24, 1989, in Lebanon, aged 88. He is interred at School Street Cemetery in Lebanon.

The Norris Cotton Cancer Center at Dartmouth-Hitchcock Medical Center in Lebanon is named for him, and a federal building in Manchester also bears his name. There is a New Hampshire historical marker (number 231) in Warren, unveiled in 2012, which says that his rise from humble beginnings "embodied an American way of life."

Family life
He married Ruth Isaacs on May 11, 1927. They had no children. Ruth died in 1978 and he married his housekeeper, Eleanor Coolidge Brown, in 1980.

References

External links

 U.S. Senate Historical Office, "Closest Election in Senate History", retrieved November 15, 2006.
 

1900 births
1989 deaths
20th-century American lawyers
George Washington University Law School alumni
New Hampshire lawyers
Phillips Exeter Academy alumni
American Congregationalists
Wesleyan University alumni
Republican Party members of the New Hampshire House of Representatives
Republican Party United States senators from New Hampshire
Speakers of the New Hampshire House of Representatives
People from Lebanon, New Hampshire
Republican Party members of the United States House of Representatives from New Hampshire
20th-century American politicians
People from Warren, New Hampshire